Boutferda is a town and rural commune in Béni Mellal Province, Béni Mellal-Khénifra, Morocco. At the time of the 2004 census, the commune had a total population of 6333 people living in 1020 households.

References

Populated places in Béni Mellal Province
Rural communes of Béni Mellal-Khénifra